Jacques Pousaz (5 August 1947 – 6 December 2022) was a Swiss professional ice hockey player who played in the Nationalliga A for HC La Chaux-de-Fonds, Genève-Servette HC and HC Sierre-Anniviers. He represented the Swiss national team at the 1972 Winter Olympics.

Pousaz died from a heart attack on 6 December 2022, at the age of 75.

References

External links
Jacques Pousaz's stats at Sports-Reference.com

1947 births
2022 deaths
Genève-Servette HC players
HC La Chaux-de-Fonds players
HC Sierre players
HC Villars players
Ice hockey players at the 1972 Winter Olympics
Olympic ice hockey players of Switzerland
Swiss ice hockey forwards